Talona is an unincorporated community in Gilmer County, in the U.S. state of Georgia.

History
"talona" is a name of Cherokee origin. Variant names include "Sanderstown", "Ta-Lo-Ney", "Tal-loe-ney", Talloney", "Taloney", and "Upper Talloney". A post office called Talona was established in 1886, and remained in operation until 1953.

References

Unincorporated communities in Georgia (U.S. state)
Unincorporated communities in Gilmer County, Georgia